The canton of Benfeld is a former canton of France, located in the Bas-Rhin department, in the Alsace region. It had 20,928 inhabitants (2012). It was disbanded following the French canton reorganisation which came into effect in March 2015. It consisted of 13 communes, which joined the canton of Erstein in 2015.

Communes
The communes of the canton of Benfeld were:

 Benfeld
 Boofzheim
 Friesenheim
 Herbsheim
 Huttenheim
 Kertzfeld
 Kogenheim
 Matzenheim
 Rhinau
 Rossfeld
 Sand
 Sermersheim
 Witternheim

See also 
 Cantons of the Bas-Rhin department

References

Benfeld
2015 disestablishments in France
States and territories disestablished in 2015